Mosalskoye is a rural locality (a selo) and the administrative center of Mosalskoye Rural Settlement, Kashirsky District, Voronezh Oblast, Russia. The population was 537 as of 2018. There are 8 streets.

Geography 
Mosalskoye is located 9 km southwest of Kashirskoye (the district's administrative centre) by road. Ryabchevo is the nearest rural locality.

References 

Rural localities in Kashirsky District, Voronezh Oblast